Martin Fischer (born 21 July 1986) is an Austrian retired professional tennis player. His career-high ranking was no. 117 achieved on 11 October 2010.

Performance timeline

Singles

ATP Challenger and ITF Futures finals

Singles: 20 (12–8)

Doubles: 46 (30–16)

External links
 Official Page

References 

Austrian male tennis players
People from Dornbirn
1986 births
Living people
Sportspeople from Vorarlberg